The Voice Senior is a Belgian reality singing competition for the Flemish part of Belgium, and which is part of the franchise that started in the Netherlands as The Voice of Holland. It kicked off in  2018 on VTM, shortly before the francophone Belgian variant The Voice Belgique went on air.

One of the important premises of the show is the quality of the singing talent. Four coaches, themselves popular performing artists, train the talents in their group and occasionally perform with them. Talents are selected in blind auditions, where the coaches cannot see, but only hear the auditioner.

Format 
The series consists of three phases: a blind audition, a battle phase, and live performance shows. Four judges/coaches, all noteworthy recording artists, choose teams of contestants through a blind audition process. Each judge has the length of the auditioner's performance (about one minute) to decide if he or she wants that singer on his or her team; if two or more judges want the same singer (as happens frequently), the singer has the final choice of coach.

Each team of singers is mentored and developed by its respective coach. In the second stage, called the battle phase, coaches have two of their team members battle against each other directly by singing the same song together, with the coach choosing which team member to advance from each of four individual "battles" into the first live round. Within that first live round, the surviving four acts from each team again compete head-to-head, with public votes determining one of two acts from each team that will advance to the final eight, while the coach chooses which of the remaining three acts comprises the other performer remaining on the team.

In the final phase, the remaining contestants (Final 8) compete against each other in live broadcasts. The television audience and the coaches have equal say 50/50 in deciding who moves on to the final 4 phase. With one team member remaining for each coach, the (final 4) contestants compete against each other in the finale with the outcome decided solely by public vote.

Coaches and hosts 
On 17 December 2017 VTM announced they will produce a new singing competition for singers over the age of 60, which entitled Talpa's The Voice Senior, with Walter Grootaers as the first coach announced. On 29 June 2018 the coaching panel for the first season was confirmed with Grootaers, Helmut Lotti, Dana Winner and Natalia Druyts, who is also a coach on the Adult and Kids versions. Former host of The Voice Van Vlaanderen and The Voice Kids , An Lemmens, appointed as hosts for the first season.

On 26 November 2019 it was announced that Karen Damen, Sam Gooris and André Hazes jr. would replace Lotti, Natalia and Winner as new coaches, along with returning coach Grootaers.

Coaches and finalists 
 – Winner
 – Runner-Up
 – Third Place
 – Fourth Place

Series overview 
Colour key

 Team Helmut
 Team Walter
 Team Natalia
 Team Dana
 Team Sam
 Team Karen
 Team André

See also
The Voice (TV series)

References

External links
The Voice van Vlaanderen Official website

2012 Belgian television series endings
Flemish television shows
2010s Belgian television series
2011 Belgian television series debuts
The Voice van Vlaanderen
Belgian reality television series
VTM (TV channel) original programming